Geoff Morrell (born 19 February 1958) is an Australian film, television and theatre actor.

Career
Morrell began his career in theatre acting, becoming a founding member of the Theatre South organisation. In 1983, he briefly moved to England, featuring in a number of productions there.

In 1985, he branched into film acting, with a minor role in a telemovie version of Oscar Wilde's Lady Windermere's Fan. Over the next few years, he moved between film and theatre, starring in productions such as Macbeth and King Lear, as well as several supporting roles in films, telemovies, mini-series and regular series. These included notable Australian films Blackrock and Oscar and Lucinda. He has had guest roles in the series The Secret Life of Us, Stingers and Farscape.

Morrell starred as Harry in Australia's first production of Michael Gow's play Away, which was performed by the Griffin Theatre Company and premiered at the Stables Theatre, Sydney on 7 January 1986.

After filming Oscar And Lucinda, Morrell won the role of forensic scientist Lance Fisk in the series Murder Call, which screened from 1997 to 1999. In 2000, he won one of his most significant roles to date, as the protagonist of the ABC series Grass Roots. The series was not renewed after the 2001 season, and Morrell followed this with a major role in the ABC telemovie Marking Time, as the father of a boy in love with an asylum seeker.

Morrell won the 2000 AFI Award for Best Actor for Grass Roots, and has been nominated four times, for Fallen Angels (1997), Grass Roots 2nd series, Changi (2001) and Marking Time. He has been nominated for three silver Logies for Grass Roots (first and second series) and Changi (2001).

In 2004, Morrell made a move into the mainstream when he became one of four new actors to join the long-running police series Blue Heelers, on which he played Sergeant Mark Jacobs. In September 2004, there was speculation that the ABC would commission a third series of Grass Roots. However, Morrell stated that the ABC "may have missed its chance", and as he remained contracted to Blue Heelers, would likely not have been able to participate if the series did return. Due to family commitments, Morrell chose to leave Blue Heelers.

He has also been involved in the film Right Here Right Now. In 2010 Morrell made a return to ABC to star alongside Richard Roxburgh in the first series of Rake. Morrell played the role of Joe Sandilands, a fictional NSW Attorney-General involved in the inside wheeling and dealing of the Labour Party.
In 2015, he appeared as Inspector Clive Small, in the 2-part telemovie Catching Milat.
He continues to act in theatre, in addition to films. He appeared in the feature film Rogue, and Tony Hayes' feature film debut Ten Empty. In 2010 he began work on the set of Cloudstreet, a television miniseries version of Tim Winton's novel. He plays the role of Lester Lamb.

Filmography
Theatre Night (1985)
The Bill (1986)
 The Monocled Mutineer (1986)
Rafferty's Rules (1988)
Captain James Cook (1988) (TV TV Mini-Series)
Round the Twist (1989)
Strangers  (1991)
The Flying Doctors (1991)
Dusty Hearts (Short) (1992)
The Girl Who Came Late (1992)
G.P. (1993)
No Worries (1994)
Heartbreak High (1994)
Bordertown (1995)
Blue Murder (1995)
Mr. Reliable  My Entire Life 1996)
Fallen Angels (1996)
Blackrock (1997)
Oscar and Lucinda (1997)
Murder Call (series) (1997–1999)
Good Guys, Bad Guys (1998)
Never Tell Me Never (1998)
Looking for Alibrandi (2000)
Grass Roots (series) (2000–2001)
Changi (mini-series) (2001)
My Husband My Killer (2001)
The Secret Life of Us  (2001)
Farscape (2003)
Ned Kelly (2003)
 Stingers (2003)
Marking Time (telemovie) (2003)
Go Big (telemovie) (2004
Blue Heelers (series) (2004–2005)
Right Here Right Now (2004)
Second Chance (telemovie) (2005)
 All Saints (2006)
Bastard Boys (2007)
Curtain (telemovie)  (2007)
Lucky Miles (2007)
Rogue (2007)
Emerald Falls (2008)
Sea Patrol (2008)
Ten Empty (2008)
Bed of Roses (2008)
The View From Greenhaven (2008)
Rogue Nation (2008)
Packed to the Rafters (2009)
Coffin Rock (2009)
 Not Available (short) (2010)
Rake (2010)
Oranges and Sunshine (2010)Ragtime (short) (2011)Small Time Gangster (2011)Cloudstreet (2011)Winners & Losers (2011)Census (short) (2012)Dripping in Chocolate (2012)Home and Away (2011–2012)Miss Fisher's Murder Mysteries (2013)
 Serangoon Road (2013)
 Novr (short) (2013)Shelter (short) (2013)The Mule (2014)8MMM Aboriginal Radio (2015)Catching Milat (2015)
 Foal (short) (2015)Red Christmas (2017)The Code (2016)Deep Water (2016)Please Like Me (2015-2016)
 Top of the Lake: China Girl (2017)
 Fucking Adelaide (2017)
 Nippers of Dead Bird Bay (2017)Harrow'' (2019)
The Lord of the Rings: The Rings of Power (2022)

References

External links
 

AACTA Award winners
Australian male film actors
Australian male stage actors
Australian male television actors
1958 births
Living people